Complete is a compilation album by Australian band The Veronicas which was released in Japan on 18 March 2009 by Pony Canyon, and Latin America on 11 August 2009.

Information
The compilation album is a two-disc album that contains all the songs from their debut album The Secret Life of... and Hook Me Up and also includes 3 bonus tracks.

Track listing
This is the track listing for the 2 disc album:

Disc one: The Secret Life of...
"4ever" (Lukasz "Dr. Luke" Gottwald, Max Martin) – 3:30
"Everything I'm Not" (Gottwald, Martin, Jess Origliasso, Lisa Origliasso, Rami) – 3:24
"When It All Falls Apart" (Josh Alexander, J. Origliasso, L. Origliasso, Billy Steinberg) – 3:15
"Revolution" (Chantal Kreviazuk, Raine Maida) – 3:07
"Secret" (Toby Gad, J. Origliasso, L. Origliasso) – 3:34
"Mouth Shut" (Toby Gad, J. Origliasso, L. Origliasso) – 3:39
"Leave Me Alone" (Alexander, J. Origliasso, L. Origliasso, Steinberg) – 3:31
"Speechless" (Toby Gad, J. Origliasso, L. Origliasso) – 3:58
"Heavily Broken" (Eric Nova, J. Origliasso, L. Origliasso) – 4:18
"I Could Get Used to This" (Alexander, J. Origliasso, L. Origliasso, Steinberg) – 3:16
"Nobody Wins" (Kara DioGuardi, Clif Magness, J. Origliasso, L. Origliasso) – 3:53
"Mother Mother" (Tracy Bonham) – 3:08
"Did Ya Think" (Clif Magness, Kara DioGuardi, J. Origliasso, L. Origliasso) – 2:45*

Disc two: Hook Me Up
"Untouched" (Toby Gad, Jessica Origliasso, Lisa Origliasso) – 4:14
"Hook Me Up" (J. Origliasso, L. Origliasso, Shelly Peiken, Greg Wells) – 2:56
"This Is How It Feels" (T. Gad, J. Origliasso, L. Origliasso) – 4:11
"This Love" (T. Gad, Kesha Sebert) – 2:59
"I Can't Stay Away" (Josh Alexander, Billy Steinberg) – 3:26
"Take Me on the Floor" (T. Gad, J. Origliasso, L. Origliasso) – 3:30
"I Don't Wanna Wait" (John Feldman, J. Origliasso, L. Origliasso) – 2:59
"Popular" (Beni Barca, T. Gad, J. Origliasso, L. Origliasso) – 2:44
"Revenge Is Sweeter (Than You Ever Were)" (T. Gad, J. Origliasso, L. Origliasso) – 3:43
"Someone Wake Me Up" (Alexander, J. Origliasso, L. Origliasso, Steinberg) – 3:35
"All I Have" (T. Gad, J. Origliasso, L. Origliasso) – 3:14
"In Another Life" (T. Gad, J. Origliasso, L. Origliasso) – 3:47
"Goodbye to You" (Smith) – 3:14*
"Insomnia" (T. Gad, J. Origliasso, L. Origliasso) – 3:38*

Songs with a * indicate that it is a bonus track.

Release history

References

2009 compilation albums
The Veronicas albums
Pony Canyon compilation albums
Warner Music Group compilation albums